Thanks for the Buggy Ride is a 1928 American comedy film directed by William A. Seiter and written by Beatrice Van and Tom Reed. The film stars Laura La Plante, Glenn Tryon, Richard Tucker, Kate Price, Jack Raymond and Trixie Friganza. The film was released on April 1, 1928, by Universal Pictures.

Cast        
Laura La Plante as Jenny
Glenn Tryon as Joe Hall
Richard Tucker as Mr. McBride
Kate Price as Mrs. Crogan
Jack Raymond as Mr. Belkoff
Trixie Friganza as Actress
Lee Moran as Bill Barton
David Rollins as Harold McBride

References

External links
 

1928 films
1920s English-language films
Silent American comedy films
1928 comedy films
Universal Pictures films
Films directed by William A. Seiter
American silent feature films
American black-and-white films
1920s American films